Doug Gale was an early developer of the Internet. Gale earned a Ph.D. in Physics from Kansas State University in 1972, and served as a tenured Associate Professor of Physics at East Texas State University for eight years, during which time his research interests shifted to computer science.

Contributions to the Internet 
Gale changed careers in 1980 to the management of information technology, serving as the Director of Decentralized Computing at Cornell University until 1984. Subsequently, he served as Chief Information Officer at the University of Nebraska-Lincoln and the George Washington University, and Director of OARnet, a regional Internet Service Provider. In 2003 he founded a consultancy Information Technology Associates, LLC.

In 1986 Gale founded MIDnet, one of the original mid-level networks on the NSFNET and the first to become fully operational.  He later served as the Program Director of NSFNET for the National Science Foundation where he was responsible for adding colleges and universities to the fledgling network and upgrading the backbone to DS-3.  In 1996 he prepared the white paper that led to the creation of Internet2.

Gale founded the Internet Legacy Institute, LLC in 2010 to preserve and archive information and original source materials about the creation and evolution of the Internet.

Major awards 
In 1991 he received the “Director’s Award for Program Officer Excellence” at the National Science Foundation for his contributions.   In 2008 he received the Catalyst Award from Educause on behalf of the Regional Networks on the NSFNET. In 2016 he was awarded the Internet2 President’s Leadership Award posthumously. His wife of 50 years, Henrietta, accepted the award with their sons Marc and Eric.

References

External links
Internet Legacy Institute archived at Charles Babbage Institute  "administrative records and original research into the history of the internet, information taxonomy, and the papers of the project's founders" 
NSF – NSF and the Birth of the Internet – Special Report

(Obituary)

American computer scientists
Internet pioneers
1942 births
2015 deaths
Kansas State University alumni
Texas A&M University–Commerce faculty
University of Nebraska–Lincoln faculty
George Washington University faculty